Zavron (Russian and Tajik: Заврон) is a village in Sughd Region, northern Tajikistan. It is part of the jamoat Loiq Sherali in the city of Panjakent.

References

Populated places in Sughd Region